Pseudostomum is a genus of flatworms in the family Pseudostomidae.

Species 
The following species are recognised:

 Pseudostomum arenarium Meixner, 1938
 Pseudostomum californicum Karling, 1962
 Pseudostomum coecum (Graff, 1882)
 Pseudostomum gracilis Westblad, 1955
 Pseudostomum klostermanni (Graff, 1874)
 Pseudostomum quadrioculatum (Leuckart, 1847)

References

External links 
 
 Pseudostomum at the World Register of Marine Species (WoRMS)

Turbellaria genera